Sayeda Zakia Noor Lipi is a Grand Alliance politician and the incumbent Member of Bangladesh Levgistvie Council member from Kishoregonj 1. This is the same constituency which her father, Syed Nazrul Islam, national leader and the acting president of Mujibnagar Government 1971, and her eldest brother, Sayed Ashraful Islam, the Ex-General Secretary of Bangladesh Awami League and a cabinet minister, represented for over three decades.

References

Living people
Alumni of Loughborough University
Awami League politicians
11th Jatiya Sangsad members
Women members of the Jatiya Sangsad
Year of birth missing (living people)
Place of birth missing (living people)
Bangladeshi people of Arab descent
People from Kishoreganj District
21st-century Bengalis
21st-century Bangladeshi women politicians